The Social Democratic Party (PSD) is a political party in Cape Verde.

History 
The PSD was established by João Alem in 1992 as a split from the Democratic and Independent Cape Verdean Union (UCID). In the 1995 parliamentary elections it received only 1,030 votes (0.7%), failing to win a seat.

The 2001 elections saw the party receive just 620 votes (0.5%). Its vote share fell to 0.4% in the 2006 elections and 0.2% in the 2011 elections.

References 

Political parties in Cape Verde
Social democratic parties
Political parties established in 1992
1992 establishments in Cape Verde
Socialism in Cape Verde